The Future Trees Trust is a charity, formed in 2008, which aims to improve and increase the stock of hardwood trees in Britain and Ireland.

History
The British and Irish Hardwoods Improvement Programme (BIHIP) was established in 1991 with the aim of improving and increasing the stock of hardwood trees in Britain and Ireland. It was renamed the Future Trees Trust in 2008.

The Future Trees Trust is a registered charity in England and Wales, and Ireland. It is supported by a network of organisations, and has six species groups that lead research on: ash, birch, cherry, oak, sycamore, and walnut. In 2019 and 2020, it helped plant 3,000 ash trees in England to establish the Ash Archive. The archive consists of trees that have demonstrated resistance to the fungal pathogen Hymenoscyphus fraxineus.

References

External links
 The Future Trees Trust website
 COFORD
 Forest Research

Environmental organisations based in the United Kingdom
Environmental organisations based in Ireland
Trees of the United Kingdom
Forestry in the United Kingdom
Forestry in Ireland